"Unlighted Lamps" is a short story by Sherwood Anderson. It was published in the 1921 collection The Triumph of the Egg.

Plot summary
The story takes place in the fictional town of Huntersburg, Illinois, in June 1908. After learning from her father, Doctor Lester Cochran, on the evening before that he is suffering from a heart disease and might die at any moment, 18-year-old Mary Cochran takes a walk around the small town, thinking about her future. Her father had told her that he would be leaving her only very little money after he dies, suggesting her to "make plans for the future". He says this in a cold and toneless way, as he has never shown any real affection or warmth. Being fascinated by the atmosphere, she walks through the new factory district where the workers of the new furniture industry live, finally reaching a decayed orchard of an abandoned farm, a place she frequently visits to hide out and be alone. She thinks about her dreams to move to Chicago one day, as she feels uncomfortable with the small-town gossip around her mother leaving town with another man when she was a baby. She is disturbed in her reflections when Duke Yetter, a young man, appears after following her which makes her angry. Running away to evade him, she reaches the other end of town, where she is surprised and delighted when a man praises her father who had healed one of his sons and helped the whole family, making her feel a "great new love" for her father.
Meanwhile, her father sits at home and remembers his wife who had come to town as an actor many years ago, until she left because she could no longer bear the small-town life and the cold man whom she married. The doctor mourns of never having expressed his emotion and love for his wife to her—or his daughter. "I told myself she should have understood without words and I've all my life been telling myself the same thing about Mary. I've been a fool and a coward. I've always been silent because I've been afraid of expressing myself – like a blundering fool. I've been a proud man and a coward. tonight I'll do it. If it kills me, I'll make myself talk to the girl."
A farmer appears at his house and they ride out to the farm because the farmer's wife is bearing a child. On the way back home, he makes plans to talk to his daughter about "the whole story of his marriage and its failure sparing himself no humiliation." When he finally gets back home, where Mary is waiting for him, he dies of a heart attack.

Huntersburg, Illinois

Huntersburg, Illinois is the fictional town this short story is set in. It is situated on a railway line 50 miles to the west of Chicago. It is a typical town in the transition from a rural farming community to an industrial town on the outskirts of Chicago.
The short story mentions various places and street names. The map has been created with the information given in the story.

References

External links
Full text of story
Literary Analysis of Unlighted Lamps
Read-Aloud of the short story

1921 short stories
American short stories
Illinois in fiction
Short stories by Sherwood Anderson